Jagadguru Ramanadacharya Rajasthan Sanskrit University formerly known as Rajasthan Sanskrit University, is a public state university situated in Madau (Bhankrota) Jaipur, Rajasthan, India. It was established by Government of Rajasthan to promote Sanskrit education.

History
The university was established on 6 February 2001, and Mandan Mishra served as the first vice-chancellor of the university. On 27 June 2005 the university was renamed as Jagadguru Ramanandacharya Rajasthan Sanskrit University. Anula Maurya was appointed vice chancellor in 2019.

Academic
University affiliates more than 60 colleges of Acharya, Shastri and Shiksha shastri level throughout the state.

References

External links
 

Sanskrit universities in India
Universities and colleges in Jaipur
Universities in Rajasthan
Educational institutions established in 2001
2001 establishments in Rajasthan